Simón Moret Gallart (1853–1923) was Mayor of Ponce, Puerto Rico, from 1907 to 1914.

Early years
Moret Gallart was born in Ponce, in 1853. He was a descendant of French immigrant Clemente Moret and the Spaniard Francisca Gallart who settled in Puerto Rico in 1816.

Mayoral tenure
He was elected mayor of Ponce in 1906 and took the oath of office in 1907.  He was a member of the Union of Puerto Rico Party and defeated Manuel V. Domenech of the Republican Party in a contested election. In 1911, Mayor Moret received from the Government of the United States of America a franchise for the City of Ponce to operate the Port of Ponce in perpetuity. The port of Ponce has been operated by the municipality since then. It is the only sea port in Puerto Rico owned and administered by a municipal body.

Among Moret's mayoral accomplishments are the construction of the Ponce Firefighters Mausoleum at Cementerio Civil de Ponce, which was completed on 2 April 1911. He also built the Port of Ponce following an ordinance approved by the Consejo Ejecutivo de Puerto Rico in 1911.

Family life
On 11 December 1906, Simón Moret Gallart married Matilde Perdomo Morales. He was 53 and she was 26 when they married. Simón and Matilde had four daughters from their marriage: Josefa, Hortencia, Ana, and Carmen. In 1910, while mayor, he was a resident of Barrio Segundo, and later, in 1920, he lived in Barrio Quebrada Limón.

Death
He died in Ponce on 30 March 1923 and was buried at Cementerio Católico San Vicente de Paul. In Ponce there was a public school named after him, Elementary School Simón Moret Gallart, located at Carr 504, Km. 0.8, in barrio Portugues. The school ceased operations in 2013 and as of 2015 the Government had put out bids for its demolition.

Honors
Moret Gallard is honored at Ponce's Park of Illustrious Ponce Citizens.  Only six other mayors, of over 100 former Ponce mayors, are honored there.

See also

 Ponce, Puerto Rico
 List of Puerto Ricans

Notes

References

Further reading
 Fay Fowlie de Flores. Ponce, Perla del Sur: Una Bibliografía Anotada. Second Edition. 1997. Ponce, Puerto Rico: Universidad de Puerto Rico en Ponce. p. 216. Item 1109. 
 Cayetano Coll y Toste. Boletín Histórico de Puerto Rico. San Juan, Puerto Rico: Cantera Fernandez. 1914–1927. (Colegio Universitario Tecnológico de Ponce, CUTPO).
 Fay Fowlie de Flores. Ponce, Perla del Sur: Una Bibliografía Anotada. Second Edition. 1997. Ponce, Puerto Rico: Universidad de Puerto Rico en Ponce. p. 109. Item 560. 
 The Representative Men of Puerto Rico. Compiled and edited by F.E. Jackson & Son. C. Frederiksen, artist and photographer. s.l.: F.E. Jackson & Son. 1901. (PUCPR; Universidad Puerto Rico - Rio Piedras, UPR).
 Fay Fowlie de Flores. Ponce, Perla del Sur: Una Bibliografía Anotada. Second Edition. 1997. Ponce, Puerto Rico: Universidad de Puerto Rico en Ponce. p. 336. Item 1675. 
 Ponce. Gobierno Municipal. Informe actividades administrativas y económicas del Municipio de Ponce. (Also titled Informe del Alcalde de la Ciudad de Ponce) Ponce, Puerto Rico: Tip. Pasarell. 1908. (Archivo Histórico Municipal de Ponce)
 Fay Fowlie de Flores. Ponce, Perla del Sur: Una Bibliografía Anotada. Segunda Edición. 1997. Ponce, Puerto Rico: Universidad de Puerto Rico en Ponce. p. 337. Item 1678. 
 Ponce. Proyecto de un Empréstito para obras municipales... Ponce, Puerto Rico: Imprenta La Defensa. 1911 (Archivo Histórico Municipal de Ponce, AHMP)

Mayors of Ponce, Puerto Rico
1853 births
1923 deaths
Burials at Cementerio Católico San Vicente de Paul